MAP6 is a South Korean boy band formed in 2015, which consists of five members: Minhyuk, J.Jun, Sign, Sun and J.Vin. They debuted on November 10, 2015, with the single "Storm".

On December 10, 2019, MAP6 went on hiatus as a result of four of the five members' impending enlistment to mandatory military service the following year.

Members
 Minhyuk (민혁)
 J.Jun (제이준)
 Sign (싸인)
 Sun (썬)
 J.Vin (제이빈)

Discography

Albums

Single albums

Singles

References

External links
 

K-pop music groups
Musical groups established in 2015
South Korean boy bands
South Korean dance music groups
South Korean pop music groups
Musical groups from Seoul
2015 establishments in South Korea